Ernestine Hogan Basham Thurman (1920–1987) was an American entomologist and researcher, focusing on mosquitoes and vector control. In 1951 she was the first woman sent by the United States to Thailand to establish a malaria control program.

Education and personal life
Thurman was born in Atkins, Arkansas, US in 1920. She graduated from the University of the Ozarks with a B. S. degree in 1941 while employed as the head of biology at a local secondary school. In 1958 she was awarded a Ph. D. by the University of Maryland related to her work on mosquitoes in Thailand. 

She met Deed C. Thurman through her work and later married him. They had two children together. He died of malaria and typhoid fever in 1953. In 1964 she married J. Clyde Swartzwelder. She died in 1987 and is buried in Arlington National Cemetery.

Career
Her interest in mosquitoes start in her first post at the Florida State Department of Health. She was appointed to a post in the Malaria Control in War Areas program, planned from 1940 and active from 1942, to reduce and ideally eradicate malaria in the USA through the use of larvicide and then insecticides against the disease vector, the mosquito. She rose in the organisation to lead the mosquito identification unit of the Bureau of Vector Control in Turlock, California. Thurman was commissioned as a United States Public Health Service officer and became the first woman with the role of Scientist Director. From 1951 to 1953 she was sent with her husband to Chiang Mai in northern Thailand to start a malaria control program, the first woman sent with this role by the USA. She was assigned the task of malaria-control training advisor. This became a comprehensive program that included disseminating public health information, surveys of mosquitoes and spraying with DDT as well as training medical and technical officers. It resulted in a reduction in cases of malaria and also acted as a model for later mosquito control efforts.

Thurman returned to the USA in 1953 to a post at the National Institutes of Health’s Microbiology Institute in Bethesda, Maryland as executive secretary for the Study Section on Tropical Medicine, Division of Research Grants of the United States Public Health Service. She retired from the public health service with the rank of captain. Thurman moved to New Orleans in 1964 and in 1967 she was appointed as an associate professor in pathology at the Louisiana State University Medical Center with a primary role in administration. After resigning from this post she was a research fellow at the Center for the Study of Women at Tulane University where she was active in measures to remove barriers to women's advancement in science careers. Thurman was a member of the Sigma Delta Epsilon Graduate Women's Scientific Fraternity.

Honours and awards
In 1963 she was awarded the National Defense Service Medal for her work in 1954. She received the National Achievement Award of the Sigma Delta Epsilon Graduate Women's Scientific Fraternity in 1984.

Publications
Thurman was the author or co-author of at least 40 publications. These included:

 E. B. Thurman (1962) Asia: a challenge to scientists. AIBS Bull. 12 24–7.
 E. B. Thurman (1959) Robert Evans Snodgrass, insect anatomist and morphologist. Smithson Misc Collect. 137.
 E. Thurman and P. Johnson  (1950) The taxonomic characters of the larvae of the genus Culiseta Felt, 1904 in California. Pan-Pac Entomol. 26 179–87.
 E. B. Basham (1948) Culex (Melanoconion) mulrennani, a new species from Florida (Diptera: Culicidae). Ann Entomol Soc Am. 41 1–7.

References

1920 births
1987 deaths
American entomologists
American women scientists
University System of Maryland alumni
United States Public Health Service Commissioned Corps officers